= Ron Barrett (footballer) =

English footballer

Personal information
- Full name: Ronald Harold Barrett
- Date of birth: 22 July 1939 (age 87)
- Place of birth: Reading, Berkshire, England
- Position: Forward

Senior career*
Years	Team	Apps	(Gls)
1957–1958	Maidenhead United		
1958–1959	Grimsby Town	3	(0)
1959–19??	Poole Town		
- * Club domestic league appearances and goals

Ronald Harold Barrett (born 22 July 1939) is an English former professional footballer who played as a forward.
